Michael Manson (April 29, 1857 – July 11, 1932) was a Scottish-born farmer and political figure in British Columbia. He represented Comox from 1909 to 1916 and Mackenzie from 1924 to 1933 in the Legislative Assembly of British Columbia as a Conservative.

He was born in Pickigarth, Shetland Islands, the son of John Manson and Margaret Bain. He came to British Columbia in 1874. In 1879, Manson married Jane Renwick. He was a director of the Call Creek Oyster Company. Manson also served as a justice of the peace. From 1887 to 1895, he operated a trading post on Cortes Island with his brother John. He was defeated when he ran for reelection to the assembly in 1916. Manson died in Bella Coola at the age of 75.

The community of Mansons Landing on Cortes Island was named after him. Several of his descendants still live on the island.

References

External links 

1857 births
1932 deaths
British Columbia Conservative Party MLAs
People from Shetland